A Chump at Oxford is a Hal Roach comedy film produced in 1939 and released in 1940 by United Artists. It was directed by Alfred J. Goulding and was the penultimate Laurel and Hardy film made at the Roach studio. The title echoes the film A Yank at Oxford (1938), of which it is a partial parody.

Plot 
Stan and Ollie are down to their last six bucks. They visit an employment agency, where a call comes from Mrs. Vanderveer looking for a maid and butler to help at a dinner party she is holding that night. Ollie tells the receptionist they can fill the post. They arrive and Stan is dressed in drag, pretending to be the maid "Agnes".

At the dinner party, Stan is told to take the cocktails, but instead of clearing them away, he drinks them and becomes drunk. Mr. Vanderveer gets impatient with Ollie's incompetent attempts to seat the guests. When Mr. Vanderveer tells the drunken Stan to "serve up the salad without dressing", Stan serves the salad in his underwear. Mrs. Vanderveer faints at the sight of Stan, and Mr. Vandeveer chases Stan and Ollie out of the house.

Stan and Ollie then become road sweepers and wonder why they are always in the gutter. They decide to get an education because in Stan's words "we're not illiterate enough". They eat their lunch outside a bank building while a robbery is taking place inside. They inadvertently catch the robber when he slips on a banana peel tossed on the sidewalk by Stan. The grateful bank manager offers them a job in his bank. When Oliver mentions they would not be much use since he and Stan do not have an education, the bank president expands on their goal to attend night school by saying, "If it's an education you want, you shall have the finest education money can buy". He enrolls Stan and Ollie at Oxford University in England, and they depart the U.S. for England by liner, arriving at Southampton then taking a steam train north to Oxford.

When Stan and Ollie arrive at the university, they are accidentally dressed for Eton College. The snobby undergraduate students, led by the mischievous Johnson (Gerald Rogers) decide to give them the "royal initiation", which involves a number of pranks. They are sent off into a maze and quickly became lost. One of the students (Henry Borden) dresses as a ghost to frighten Stan and Ollie, and while they sit on a bench to sleep, the ghost's hand comes through the hedge to help Stan smoke his pipe and cigar (substituting for Stan's actual hand).

Stan and Ollie finally exit the maze the next morning. Johnson poses as the dean and gives Stan and Ollie the real dean's quarters to live in. They make themselves at home until they are confronted by the dean and the prank is uncovered. Johnson is threatened with expulsion, but the students plan to drive Stan and Ollie away to stop them testifying. Meanwhile, the boys arrive at their real quarters where Meredith the valet recognises Stan as Lord Paddington, the "greatest athlete and scholar the university ever had". He says that Lord Paddington had lost his memory and wandered from campus after a window fell on his head. Stan dismisses the story, as does Ollie who insists that Stan is the dumbest guy he ever met.

The students arrive in a slowly chanting mob, in a parody of the "hazing" scene from A Yank at Oxford. They attempt to throw Stan and Ollie out the window, but the boys try to escape through the window into the next room. The window falls on Stan's head, which transforms him back into Lord Paddington. When the students call him a "dirty snitcher", he becomes angry and his ears wiggle (something that occurs whenever Lord Paddington becomes angry, according to Meredith's story) and he throws the students out of the window. Stan does not remember Ollie any longer and throws him out the window as well.

Lord Paddington takes pity on Ollie and employs him to be his personal valet. The transformed Stan is super-human in intellect and body: his mantle is covered with athletic trophies, and his advice is sought by Albert Einstein. He nicknames Ollie "Fatty" and criticizes his manner as a servant, which makes Ollie so angry he quits his job and storms out. Stan hears students come to cheer him outside. As he looks out of the window it falls on his head once again, returning him back to his usual dumb self. Ollie storms back in, still on a tirade about the way Lord Paddington treats him, and stops only when he realizes that Stan is now back to normal. Ollie hugs his best friend, in an uncharacteristically happy ending.

Production 
A Chump at Oxford was originally conceived as a streamliner featurette. The completed film ran 42 minutes in length. Roach's distributor, United Artists, rejected the featurette and insisted on a full-length feature film, forcing Roach to add 21 more minutes of action. The added scenes, partially reworking the silent film From Soup to Nuts (1928), show Laurel and Hardy trying to find temporary jobs at the employment agency, and being assigned to work at the dinner party.

The shorter version was shelved, and the longer version was released to theaters and later to television; this 63-minute print is the version most often seen today. The shorter version was ultimately released to theaters in 1943. A later reissue was further reedited, jumping abruptly from Stan and Ollie's entering the employment agency to them sweeping the streets. A 25-minute version created for television distribution is entitled Alter Ego.

As Lord Paddington, Stan Laurel employs an upper class received pronunciation accent, the only time he affected a voice different from "Stan" on film.

Cast 

 Stan Laurel as Stan / Lord Paddington
 Oliver Hardy as Ollie
 Forrester Harvey as Meredith
 Wilfred Lucas as Dean Williams
 Forbes Murray as Banker
 Frank Baker as Dean's Servant
 Eddie Borden as Student Ghost
 Gerald Rogers as Student Johnson
 Charlie Hall (credited as Charles Hall) as Student
 Victor Kendall as Student
 Gerald Fielding as Student
 Peter Cushing as Student

Uncredited

 Evelyn Barlow
 Louise Bates
 Harry Bernard as policeman
 Stanley Blystone as policeman
 Tom Costello
 Richard Cramer
 Jean De Briac as Pierre
 Marjorie Deanne as dinner party guest
 Herbert Evans as Professor Crampton
 James Finlayson as Mr. "Baldy" Vanderveer
 Anita Garvin as Mrs. Vanderveer
 Mildred Gaye
 Mack Germaine
 Alec Harford as cab driver
 Jack Heasley as Hodges
 Jewel Jordan
 Robert Kent
 Rex Lease as robber
 Ethelreda Leopold as bank manager's secretary
 Lois Lindsay
 Sam Lufkin as water wagon driver
 George Magrill as tow-truck driver
 Stan Mckay
 James Millican as chauffeur
 Edmund Mortimer as dinner guest
 Doris Morton
 Edgar Norton as Professor Witherspoon
 William O'Brien as man in unemployment office
 Vivien Oakland as receptionist
 Jack Richardson
 Ronald R. Rondell as dinner party guest
 Elmer Serrano
 Al Thompson
 Bobby Tracy

References

External links 

 
 
 
 
 

1940 films
American buddy comedy films
American black-and-white films
Films about amnesia
Films directed by Alfred J. Goulding
Films set in Oxford
Films set in universities and colleges
Laurel and Hardy (film series)
University of Oxford in fiction
1940s buddy comedy films
Films with screenplays by Charley Rogers
Films with screenplays by Harry Langdon
Films with screenplays by Felix Adler (screenwriter)
1940s American films
1940s English-language films